Agyrtidia is a genus of moths in the subfamily Arctiinae.

Species
 Agyrtidia olivensis Filho & do Régo Barros, 1970
 Agyrtidia uranophila Walker, 1866

References

Arctiinae
Moth genera